Alexander John Corina, known as Alex Corina (born 10 October 1950 in Bradford), is an artist and community worker based in Garston, Liverpool.

Alex Corina was born in Bradford, where he attended Buttershaw Comprehensive School and Bradford College of Art. He moved in 1986 to Liverpool, where he worked as a civil servant for the Drugs Prevention and Community Safety Unit. Corina is known in Liverpool for his picture the Mona Lennon which features the Mona Lisa, John Lennon and the Liverpool waterfront in the background. It is a work that aims to represent Liverpool's past, present and future.

In 2007, Corina was named as one of Bradford College's 175 heroes as a celebration of 175 years providing education and training in Bradford.

Corina is one of the leaders behind the idea of Garston Cultural Village, which is a campaign to encourage redevelopment in Garston. On 31 May 2008, Garston declared 'Cultural Independence' at the Garston Embassy, formerly The Wellington School.

Politics
Corina's father Joe Corina, described by Bob Cryer MP as 'a well-known orator in Bradford', fostered his interest in Politics. When
Between 1980 and 1983 Alex was elected to Bradford City Council as a Labour Councillor for Wibsey Ward.

On 5 August 1983, after leading the National Union of Public Employees' Bradford Health Service Branch during the health workers' dispute of 1981–82, Corina led the Thornton View Hospital Occupation campaigning against the closure of the 82 bed long-stay geriatric hospital as branch secretary. The occupation lasted for over 2 years and was one of the longest ever hospital occupations.

On 3 May 2007, Corina stood for election as a City Councillor for the ward of Cressington, as an Independent, in the Liverpool Council election, 2007. He gained 316 votes. Corina also publicly endorsed a campaign for a referendum on an elected Mayor for Liverpool.

References

External links
 Republic of Garston becomes a reality 22 May 2008
Review: Bin there, done that; ALEX CORINA, Liverpool Echo, 22 June 2004
North West: Culture shock? by Lucy Breakwell, BBC News North West, 20 May 2005
Arts Diary: Garston turns into a village of culture; A craft centre and art workshops are to open by Philip Key reports, Daily Post (Liverpool, England), 21 July 2005

British contemporary artists
English trade unionists
1950 births
Living people